Designer's World is a plug-and-play TV game – a single-game console which plugs directly into a television – made by Tiger Electronics, a subsidiary of Hasbro. Aimed at preteen and teenage girls, the game revolves around the player building a successful fashion design company, while organizing fashion shows, managing the company's finances, and trying to keep the customers satisfied. The player travels the world doing things like designing clothes, receiving new models, buying new fabrics, and entering fashion shows. The player also receives an income for every successful fashion show. In the game, every fashion show has three judges. Every judge's difficulty is different. There are easy, medium, and hard judges. The player can find  information about a judge or model in the "Profiles" section. in the main menu. Once the player passes every fashion city in the world, the game ends and shows what the player has done during the game time.
Tiger Electronics also produced a similarly themed game also aimed at young teen girls, Dream Life.

Gameplay 
The game simulates both the business and design aspects of the fashion business. To operate a successful business in the game, players design the clothes they will sell, and then select from multiple models to show off their designs at fashion shows in Paris, New York, Tokyo and Milan.

References

External links
 Designer's World information and demo 

2006 video games
Dedicated consoles
Business simulation games
Hasbro products
Video games developed in the United States
Women and video games